This is a list of music festivals in Massachusetts, United States, both ongoing and defunct.

 Amesbury Harvest Fair and Country Music Festival
 Boston Calling Music Festival
 Boston Early Music Festival
 Byfield Music & Arts Festival
 Cape Cod Chamber Music Festival
 Chicopee Downtown Get Down
 Downtown Brockton Arts and Music Festival
 The Eisteddfod traditional folk music festival UMass Dartmouth
 Festival at the Farm
 Freshgrass Festival
 Gloucester Harvest Music Festival 
 Green River Festival
 HONK! Music Festival
 Jam & Jest Fest
 Lakeville Arts & Music Festival
 Levitate Music and Arts Festival
 Life is Good Arts and Music Festival
 Lowell Folk Festival
 Narrows Winter Blues Festival
 New Bedford Folk Festival
 New England Blues Summit
 New England Folk Festival
 Newburyport Riverfront Music Festival
 North River Blues Festival
 Remember September Music Festival
 South Shore Country Festival
 South Shore Indie Music Festival
 [StrangeCreek Campout
 Tanglewood Music Festival
 The New England Festy
 Vinegrass at Truro Vineyards
 Winchendon Music Festival
 Worcester Music Festival
 World's Peace Jubilee and International Musical Festival
 Wormtown Music Festival
 Yellow Dog Music Fest
 Ziontific Summer Solstice Music Festival

Lists of cultural festivals
Massachusetts